Belgium's Got Talent is a Belgian TV show produced by FremantleMedia and broadcast by RTL-TVI since . It is hosted by Julie Taton and Jean-Michel Zecca. It is a local adaptation (in French-speaking Belgium) of the British talent show Britain's Got Talent, created by Simon Cowell.

A TV show by the same name, hosted by Koen Wauters and Laura Tesoro, is broadcast on a Dutch-speaking channel in Belgium VTM. The judges there are Dan Karaty An Lemmens, Stan Van Samang and Niels Destadsbader.

The judges 
Maureen Dor, Carlos Vaquera and Paul Ambach are the judges for the first season of this show.

Concept 
The first season is composed of ten episodes.

Auditions 
During the first five episodes amateurs, artists, professionals and so on audition in front of the cameras, each performing their incredible talent in front of the three judges. They have to captivate the judges for two minutes. At any time, a judge can press his buzzer, in case errors in the performance are spotted (and effectively making a red cross appear above the stage). If all three judges have pressed their buzzer, the candidate is forced to stop his act and is immediately eliminated. If, however, after two minutes, the candidate hasn't received three crosses, the judges deliberate and each member gives a positive or negative vote: at least two positive votes are required to continue to the semi-finals. During this stage a judge may alter his vote (giving a negative vote even though he or she hasn't buzzed).

Semi-final 
After the auditions, the candidates having received two or three positive votes from the judges are qualified for the semi-finals. In this stage, candidates are split up into different groups. From here on, the vote of the spectators is introduced in the show and is effectively used to indicate which candidates may continue to the final. After each semi-final, the votes are tallied in order to form a top three. The first place candidate of the episode is granted immediate access to the finals. The judges choose between second and third place which candidate shall continue to the finals. All other contestants are eliminated.

Final 
During the final, the spectators are the only ones who can judge the performance of the candidates and thus elect that season's incredible talent. The candidate with the most votes receives  in prize money.

Viewers

See also 
 Got Talent

References

External links 
 Page officielle on RTL-TVI

Got Talent
Television series by Fremantle (company)
2012 Belgian television series debuts
2010s Belgian television series
Belgian reality television series
Belgian music television shows
Belgian television series based on British television series
RTL-TVI original programming